Gordon Chin (born March 26, 1983) is a Canadian former soccer player. He is of partial Chinese descent.

Primarily a midfielder, Chin has played professionally in Canada, England, the United States and China, and has represented Canada internationally at various youth levels, including at the 2003 FIFA U-20 World Cup.

Career

Youth 
Chin began playing at the youth level with local sides Metro-Ford Benfica and Metro Burnaby. He trained abroad and had tryouts throughout Europe with teams such as R.S.C. Anderlecht, Liverpool, and Manchester City. After training at the Canadian Professional Soccer Academy in Vancouver he was offered and signed a three-year deal to play at the academy level with Portsmouth in 1999.

A-League 
After his apprenticeship in Portsmouth, he returned to Vancouver in 2002 to play in the city's local circuit league the Pacific Coast Soccer League with Vancouver Explorers. After the conclusion of the PCSL season, he was drafted by the Vancouver Whitecaps in the USL A-League draft in late December 2002. He signed a contract with Vancouver for the 2003 season. Before the commencement of the regular season, he assisted Vancouver in winning the preseason tournament known as the Canterbury Cup. In his debut season in the A-League, he appeared in 14 matches. 

In order to accumulate more playing time, he was traded to league rivals Edmonton Aviators the following season. Throughout the season he was named to the league's team of the week. Unfortunately, the Edmonton franchise experienced a tumultuous season as the ownership abandoned the club which caused the league to take over the operations of the club.

Europe 
Once the season concluded Edmonton folded and Chin traveled abroad to Scotland to try out with St Johnstone. After failing to secure a contract in Scotland he signed with Halifax Town in the English Conference National in November 2004. In his single season in England, he played nine games and scored a single goal before being released in April 2005.

USL First Division 
In 2006, he returned to the USL circuit by signing with Toronto Lynx along with Rick Titus, and Osni Neto. In his debut season with Toronto, he appeared in 24 matches. He also assisted Toronto and played in the Open Canada Cup final against Ottawa St. Anthony Italia where Toronto was defeated. After the relegation of Toronto to the Premier Development League, he transitioned to indoor soccer to play with the Baltimore Blast for the MISL's 2006–07 season. He also played in the United States in 2007 with Charleston Battery for a season.

China 
In March 2008, he transferred to China, his grandfather's motherland, and signed with Yantai Yiteng of the China Jia League. The team was relegated at the end of the season and Chin had an agreement to play with Changsha Ginde the following season.  After a change in management at Ginde, he was overlooked by the new management and was later invited to train with the Whitecaps on their spring training tour in Africa.

Vancouver 
After impressing the Vancouver management staff he was signed to a one-year contract. His debut was delayed because he didn't receive his transfer papers from his previous club in time. Throughout the season he played in several matches in the 2009 Canadian Championship.  

In February 2010, the Whitecaps released him along with several other players. After his release from Vancouver, he played with Port Coquitlam Premier FC in the Vancouver Metro Soccer League.

International career 
Chin has represented Canada internationally as a member of the under-20 and under-23 teams. He was a member and co-captain of the Canada under-20 squad that qualified for the 2003 FIFA U-20 World Cup. He played in the quarterfinal match where Spain eliminated Canada from the tournament.

In 2004, he was selected to the Canada national futsal team for the 2004 CONCACAF Futsal Championship Qualifying Playoff. He played in both matches against Panama.

References

External links
Vancouver Whitecaps bio

1983 births
Living people
Association football midfielders
Baltimore Blast (2001–2008 MISL) players
California Cougars players
Canadian expatriate sportspeople in the United States
Canadian expatriate soccer players
Canadian expatriate sportspeople in China
Canadian men's futsal players
Canadian soccer players
Canadian people of Scottish descent
Charleston Battery players
National League (English football) players
Zhejiang Yiteng F.C. players
China League One players
Expatriate footballers in China
Expatriate footballers in England
Halifax Town A.F.C. players
Major Indoor Soccer League (2001–2008) players
People from Burnaby
Soccer people from British Columbia
Toronto Lynx players
A-League (1995–2004) players
USL First Division players
USL League Two players
Vancouver Whitecaps (1986–2010) players
Vancouver Whitecaps Residency players
Canadian sportspeople of Chinese descent
Canada men's youth international soccer players
Canada men's under-23 international soccer players
Canadian expatriate sportspeople in England